Michael McGrath (born September 25, 1957) is an American actor. Best known for his work on the Broadway stage, he received a Tony Award in 2012 for his performance in the musical Nice Work If You Can Get It.

Career
McGrath played the role of Patsy in the Broadway musical Spamalot (2005), for which he received a nomination for a Tony Award for Best Featured Actor in a Musical.

He played the role of Cookie McGee in the Broadway musical Nice Work If You Can Get It (2012), for which he won the Tony Award for Best Featured Actor in a Musical. He also won the Drama Desk Award for Outstanding Featured Actor in a Musical for this performance. McGrath originated the role of Mr. Simmons in Memphis (Broadway, 2009). He has been an ensemble member and understudy for many shows, including My Favorite Year (musical), Swinging on a Star and Little Me. He has appeared in the musicals Anything Goes as Moonface Martin and in Wonderful Town (2003) as Chick Clark.

He starred in the play Is He Dead? on Broadway in December 2007 to February 2008 as Agamemnon Buckner.

In 2014, he was in the A.R.T. pre-Broadway production of Finding Neverland replacing Roger Bart in the dual role of Charles Frohman and Captain James Hook.

He is appearing in a new musical The Honeymooners, based on the television comedy The Honeymooners. The musical premiered at the Paper Mill Playhouse, Milburn, New Jersey on September 28, 2017, and stars McGrath as Ralph Kramden, Michael Mastro as Ed Norton, Leslie Kritzer as Alice Kramden, and Laura Bell Bundy as Trixie Norton. McGrath appeared in a workshop of the musical in 2014.

On television, McGrath was the announcer/sidekick on The Martin Short Show.

While working in the Boston production of Forbidden Broadway, McGrath met his future wife, Toni DiBuono.

Awards and nominations

Personal life
McGrath is from Worcester, Massachusetts. He is married to actress Toni DiBuono.

References

External links
 
 
 

1957 births
American male musical theatre actors
Living people
Male actors from Worcester, Massachusetts
Singers from Massachusetts
Theatre World Award winners
Tony Award winners